Irinjalakuda is a municipal town in Thrissur district, Kerala, India. It is the headquarters of 
Irinjalakuda Revenue Division and Mukundapuram Taluk. After Thrissur, this town has most number of administrative, law-enforcement and judicial offices in the district.  The place is well-known for Koodalmanikyam Temple and the Thachudaya Kaimals  who  had princely status  until 1971. The earliest recorded history of this temples dates back to the ninth century of Common Era (CE).

Etymology
The name Irinjalakuda has been derived from "Iru" and "Chaal", meaning two streams. According to another legend, the origin of the name Irinjalakuda came from 'Irinjalikoodal'. 'Koodal' simply means merge, merging of two rivers. So it shows that Irinjalakuda may have gradually developed, from 'Irinjalikoodal', that derived from 'Inangikoodal', means merge. At present there is no river in Irinjalakuda, only the myth of river.

Irinjalakuda can be derived from 'iru njyaala koda' ( ഇരുഞാലകൊട) i.e., donation of two worlds, which is what Mahabali is said to have done in the story of the Vaamanaavataaram.

Mythological history and legends
According to Hindu mythology, Irinjalakuda was created by sage Parasurama. According to Keralolpatthi, out of the 64 gramas (villages) established in Kerala (Out of these 32 Malayala Gramas & half Thulu grama viz. Manjeswaram are in the present Kerala and 31 1/2 Thulu gramas in the coastal Karnataka.), Irinjalakuda was the head of some of them. Irinjalakuda was one of the most prominent among these Gramas (village societies). Boundaries of this grama extends up to  Aloor in the east and Kakkathuruthi in the west and later extended to Koodapuzha in the east. Like the other Gramas this 'Grama' also followed Sankara Smruthi (a modified form of the 'Chathurvarnia' system of society with some Kerala model variations which lay upon caste system based on the 'Manusmruthi').

Another legend suggests that the origin of the name Irinjalakuda were traditionally associated as, "Irunnu Salayil Koodai", and "Virinja Alu Kuda". There is a huge Banyan tree still standing in the centre of the Irinjalakuda spreading the branches to the sky like an umbrella.

The Thachudaya Kaimal is a spiritual dignitary of Kerala Hindus and the temporal ruler of the Koodalmanikyam Temple and its Estates. The line goes back into antiquity and is mentioned in the Skanda Purana. The Arms of the Kaimal and that of the temple bear the insignia of a coiled conch-shell with the words 'Manikkam Keralar'. With the 26th amendment of the Indian constitution in 1971, the Princely order in India was abolished and the Thachudaya Kaimals lost their position in the temple and its estates. It is now managed by a Trust managed by the District Collector although a vestige of former power lies in his being the chief trustee of the temple. 
The Devaswom was  allotted land to accommodate institutions such as the  Christ College, and for public use to facilitate development activities in the region. Much land that belonged to Koodalmanikyam was subjected to encroachment.

Recorded history
The following text is a translation of the scholarly work titled 'Koodalmanikyam Temple and Kerala Society' published in Sahapedia.

https://map.sahapedia.org/article/കൂടല്‍മാണിക്യം-ക്ഷേത്രവും-കേരള-സമൂഹവും/10626
  
The fact remains that the Iringalakuda temple is centuries old, regardless of the oral stories. The stone inscriptions found inside the temple are proof of this. The inscriptions on two stones lying on the north side of the temple shrine were noticed by the authorities and in nineteen forties they were placed on the western wall of the temple and preserved. The Malayalam script text of these documents was published in the Bulletin of the Ramavarma Institute Volume IX Part 1 and became an authoritative proof of the temple's antiquity. Today there are two inscriptions on the walls of the temple namely Sthanuravi Inscription and Bhaskaranambiranar Inscription. The Sthanuravi inscription was written in the 11th regnal year of Cheraman Perumal. It is estimated to be common year 854. This inscription consists of twelve lines. Many of the letters have faded away as people have stepped on them for a long time. This document is about a land transaction. The letters in the places indicated by dots are faded.

The second record, the Bhaskaranambiranar record, dates back to the 10th century. It is believed to have been written between 950 and 1000 AD. There are nineteen lines in this inscription. It can be assumed that the letters have not faded much compared to the first inscription. In this inscription the deity of Kudalmanikya is described as 'Thiruvirungadi Kudal Thiruvadi'.

Two similar words irangadi(kkuta) and irangadikudal are found in both the inscriptions respectively. It is only that the epithet Thiru has been added in the second inscription. It is clear from this that the name Iringalakuda came from this old place name and the deity here was described as 'Thiruviringadikudal Thiruvadi' as early as the 10th century.

There are those who argue that it can be understood from this record that it had already become a Brahminical temple in the 10th century AD. There is also a belief that this temple was a Jain center before it became a Brahminical temple. It is also noteworthy that one of the major temples nearby, Trikanamatilakam, was a Jain center.

Some suggest that the Koodalmanikya is an idol of the Jain Tirthankara Bharateshvara in the Digabara form. They believe that the temple became a Brahminical center as part of the Hindu revival in the 8th century. In Manipravala's work 'Kokilasandesa', it is mentioned that women were not allowed to enter Koodalmanikyam temple. There are those who read in connection with this remark the fact that women are not admitted in Jain temples. Thachudayakaimal, the last ruler of the temple, has refuted this claim.

Place name scholars say that the word Iringa in Iringalakuda refers to the Jain center. Also, V.V.K. said that the two-storied Jain temples are referred to as 'koodam'. Historians such as Wallat point out this.

Later History
In 1762, Maharaja Kingdom of Cochin formed Mukundapuram taluk by adding Mapranam nadu and parts of Nandilathu nadu to Mukundapuram nadu (Muriyanadu). In the last decade of the 18th Century, the last Naduvazhi Nambiar of Mukundapuram nadu (Murija nadu) died and Sakthan Thampuran confiscated all the powers and properties of Mukundapuram Nambiar and Mapranam Nambiar. Sakthan Thampuran divided old Mukundapuram Taluk into six Properties viz. 1) Thazhekkad 2) Areepalam, 3) Mukundapuram (Nadavarambu) 4) Mapranam 5) Palathungal (Nandikkara) 6) Pudukkad for administrative and revenue purposes. Five more proverties were added to Mukundapuram Taluk afterwards: Kodassery (Chalakudy), Thirumukkulam (Kuzhur)), Koratty (Adur), Pathinettarayalam (Edavilangu) and Malayattur. Tipu Sultan's Army was based at Thazhekkad Proverty of Mukundapuram Taluk on 24 December 1789 to attack the Nedumkotta which is situated in the middle of Kochi Kingdom and was known as Travancore lines and attacked KonurKottavathil in January 1790.

When new Chalakudy taluk was formed in 2013 by bifurcating Mukundapuram taluk, it lost more than 50% of its territory.

Culture

Irinjalakuda has a rich cultural history associated with the UNESCO- recognised classical dance form Koodiyattam.
Natanakairali - Research Training and Performing Centre for Traditional Arts, Irinjalakuda, is a prominent institution that imparts training on this ancient art form. Government-aided Unnayi Warrier Smaraka Kalanilayam near Koodalmanikyam temple trains artistes on Kathakali. The town also has other institutions that give training on classical dance forms and theatre arts. Walden Pond House is another cultural space in the town where artists and movie makers gather for workshops and movie shoots.

Entertainment 
There are a number of good cinema halls in the town. JK Cinemas with two screens (Located in Kizhuthani), Chembakassery Movies with three screens, MAS Movies with two screens and Varna Cinemas with a single screen (Mapranam) are the major theatres in the town. Besides this, the town often hosts various cultural programmes organised by socio-cultural organisations.

Population

Demographics
 India census, Irinjalakuda had a population of 28,741. With the amalgamation of Porathissery Panchayath with the municipality, the total population has crossed 50,000. Males constitute 48% of the population and females 52%. Irinjalakuda has an average literacy rate of 96% which is much higher than the national average of 74.65%. While male literacy stands at 97.12%, female literacy is 94.56%. 10% of the population is under 6 years of age.

Religion  
Its St. Thomas Cathedral is the episcopal see of the Syro-Malabar Catholic Eparchy of Irinjalakuda (Chaldean = Syro-Oriental Rite).

Before the arrival of Tipu Sulthan to Mukundapuram Taluk in December 1789 the headquarters of Padruado Archbishops of Cranganore (Kodungallur) of Nazranis (Padruado faction of Syro Malabar Catholic Church ) was at Pookkatt (Aripalam). (See Varthamanapusthakam of Paremmakkal Thoma Kathanar, Gobernador and ArchaDeacon of late eighteenth century). Sakthan Thampuran brought four Christian families for improving commerce and trade to the place known as ‘Chanthappura’. When they struck gold in this field, more of this community migrated  from Kombara chantha and settled in the area and now it became one of the strongholds of this community. Besides Hindu and Christian communities this area consists of  Muslims.
Karukulangara Narasimhaswamy Temple, Irinjalakuda, north west side, about 1.5 km from the Irinjalakuda municipal bus stand, a famous and oldest temple of Irinjalakuda

Celebrities
The famous actor Innocent  was born here. Innocent is an Indian film actor best known for his work in Malayalam films who later went on to become Member of Parliament for Chalakudy (Lok Sabha constituency).

Tovino Thomas, is an Indian actor, model, and film producer who is active in Malayalam films was born here.

A prominent Kerala mathematician-astronomer Madhava (Mādhava) who founded the Kerala school of astronomy and mathematics was from (Irinjalappilly, Aloor) Sangamagrama (Saṅgamagrāma), a town in medieval Kerala believed to be the town of Irinjalakuda. Nagapattinam Chandrashekhara Vasanthakokilam a carnatic singer and actress, was born as Kamakshi in Irinjalakkuda, Cochin State of British India, the present Kerala.

The late football player and Olympian O Chandrasekhar Menon was born here.

Famous Actress Anupama Parameshwaran, who is well known in the Telugu, Tamil, and Kannada film industries, was also belongs from here.

Governance

Irinjalakuda is governed by Irinjalakuda Municipality. The municipality was formed on 8 February 1936 with an area of 11.24 square kilometres. 
K.I. Varunny was the first municipal chairman and the municipality was divided into 22 electoral wards. Now, the Municipality has 41 wards.
 
Irinjalakuda is the headquarters of the Mukundapuram Taluk and is a Grade-I municipality.Irinjalakuda Revenue Division was formed in May 2018. It is headed by a Revenue Divisional Officer (RDO). The office is situated in the Mini Civil Station Annexe building. The revenue division comprises Mukundapuram, Chalakudy and Kodungallur taluks.

As the second-most important administrative town in the district,  Irinjalakuda houses a large number of government offices, most of them situated at the mini civil station and its annexe buildings near Porathissery.

 Irinjalakuda Courts & Judicial Offices 

 Additional District and Sessions Court/ Motor Accident Claims Tribunal
 Family Court
 Fast Track Special Court (POCSO cases)
 Principal Sub Court/Principal Assistant Sessions Court/Commercial Court -I
 Additional Sub Court/Additional Assistant Sessions Court/Commercial Court- II
 Judicial First Class Magistrate Court-1
 Principal Munsif Court/Judicial First Class Magistrate Court-3
 Additional Munsif Court/Judicial First Class Magistrate Court-2
 Taluk Legal Services Committee
 Mediation Sub Centre
 Office of the Additional Public Prosecutor cum Government Pleader

A new judicial complex is under construction near the civil station to house all judicial offices in the town.

Irinjalakuda has a special sub jail, which is function ing near the civil station complex. A land tribunal to provide land deeds and to dispose of land transfer disputes is functioning at the civil station. The tribunal started functioning in 2019.

At present the chairperson of the municipality is Smt Sonia Giri. The MLA of the Irinjalakuda legislative constituency  is Dr. R. Bindu. Irinjalakuda assembly constituency was a part of Mukundapuram (Lok Sabha constituency) till 2009 Lonappan Nambadan was the last Loksabha MP of Mukundapuram. From 2009, Irinjalakuda is now a part of Thrissur (Lok Sabha constituency). 
The MP of Thrissur Lok Sabha constituency is T.N Prathapan

 

Important government offices

 Revenue Divisional Office (RDO) /Sub Divisional Magistrate Court (SDM) /Maintainance Tribunal
 Mukundapuram Taluk office
 District Education Office
 Rural District Treasury
 KSEB Circle & Division offices
 KSEB Transmission Division & 110KV substation (being upgraded to 220KV)
 Excise Circle and Range offices
 Postal Division office
 Head Post Office and State Speedpost Centre
 Water Authority PH Division
 GST Assistant Commissioner's office 
 Factories and Boilers office
 Central Excise and CGST Range office
 PWD Roads Subdivision
 PWD Buildings Subdivision
 PWD Special Buildings Section
 State Lottery Sub-office
 Land Tribunal office
 Koodal Manikyam Devaswam Board office
 Sub Registrar's office
 Cashew Workers Welfare Board Inspector office
 Headload Workers Welfare Board office
 Mukundapuram Sub Treasury 
 Dairy Development office
 Labour office
 Sub Regional Transport office
 KSRTC Operating Centre
 Taluk Statistical office
 Taluk Industries office
 Taluk Welfare Office
 Assistant Registrar (General) & Assistant Director (Audit) of Cooperative Societies
 Assistant Director of Agriculture
 Agmark Laboratory
 Parasite Breeding Station
 Employees State Insurance Corporation
 Taluk Supply Office
 Minor Irrigation Sub Division
 BSNL Sub Division
 Legal Metrology
 Employment Exchange
 Irinjalakuda Block office
 Irinjalakuda, Manavalassery, Porathissery, Madayikkonam Village offices
 Veterinary Poly Clinic
 Sub-district Water Quality Testing Laboratory
 Government Textbook Depot
 Food Safety Circle office

Besides, most nationalised banks, new generation private banks and old private-sector banks have branches in Irininjalakuda. Both South Indian Bank and Federal Bank have their regional offices here.

Police offices

 DYSP office
 Irinjalakuda Police Station
 Subdivisional Police Training Centre
 Thrissur Rural Vanitha Police Station
 Thrissur Rural Cyber Crime Police Station
 Thrissur Rural Command and Control Centre
 Thrissur Rural Dog Squad
 Thrissur Rural District Forensic Science Laboratory
 Thrissur Rural Emergency Response Support System (ERSS)
 Thrissur Rural HOPE

As part of shifting the Thrissur Rural police headquarters to Irinjalakuda, new buildings are being constructed at police station premises in Kattungachira

Transportation

Road
Irinjalakuda is located on State Highway 22 (Kerala), which links to major national highways NH 47 and NH 66 in the State. Two major roads State Highway 22 (Kerala) (Kodungallur-Shornur) Road and State Highway 61 (Kerala) (Potta-Moonupeedika) criss-crosses Irinjalakuda town. Besides, several MDRs (Major District Roads) connect the town with villages in the interior parts of the western and eastern sides of the town. These include Irinjalakuda-Kattoor road, Irinjalakuda-Porathissery Road, Mapranam-Nandhikkara road and Mapranam Karalam road. 

KSRTC bus station is situated behind the Koodalmanikyam temple. KSRTC operates services to state capital Trivandrum, Ernakulam/Kochi, Kottayam, Kozhikode, Palakkad, Munnar and Mananthavady. Besides, plenty of private buses are available from Irinjalakuda to various places within the district and towns in neighbouring districts. For those travelling from southern parts of the state, Chalakudy is the major roadhead to proceed towards Irinjalakuda. Private buses frequently ply between Chalakudy and Irinjalakuda. For travellers from northern Kerala, plenty of private buses are available from Thrissur Shakthan Thampuran private bus stand.

Railways

The nearest railway station is the Irinjalakuda Railway Station which is about 8 km east of the town at Kallettumkara. Irinjalakuda Railway Station is managed by the Southern Railway of Indian Railways. A total of 39 trains, including superfast, express and passenger trains, have stop here. Thrissur railway station is the nearest major railhead with stop for all trains, which is just 22 km from Irinjalakuda.
Irinjalakuda Sorting (Railway Mail Services) also functions at Kallettumkara in the premises of post office. There are daily trains available from Irinjalakuda to Chennai, Bengaluru, Mangaluru, Tiruchirapalli, Coimbatore, Madurai, Trivandrum, Kozhikode, Vijayawada, Nagpur, Pune, Tirupati/Renigunta, Warangal and Salem.

Important trains that stop here include:

 Kanniyakumari-Bengaluru-Kanniyakumari Express

 Kanniyakumari-Pune Express

 Nagercoil-Mangaluru-Nagercoil Parasuram Express

 Alappuzha-Chennai-Alappuzha Superfast Express

 Ernakulam-Karaikal-Ernakulam Express

 Kochuveli-Gorakhpur-Kochuveli Raptisagar Superfast Express

 Kochuveli-Indore-Kochuveli Superfast Express

 Trivandrum-Guruvayur-Trivandrum Intercity Express

 Ernakulam-Kannur-Ernakulam Intercity Express

 Ernakulam-Barauni (Bihar)- Ernakulam Superfast Express

 Guruvayur-Chennai Egmore-Gurvayur Express

Nearest Airport
The nearest airport is the Cochin International Airport at Nedumbassery, which is 38 km away. The airport is well connected to all major airports in India and also connected to many foreign cities. Direct flights are available to Chennai, New Delhi, Mumbai, Bangalore and Kolkata.

Healthcare

Irinjalakuda has several hospitals and health clinics. Most important among them are Government General Hospital (Tana), Irinjalakuda Cooperative Hospital (Nadavaramba), Lal Memorial Hospital (Mapranam), Sacred Heart Mission Hospital (Pullur), Government Ayurveda Hospital (AKP Junction) and Marina Hospital (Tana). Another prominent healthcare facility is the National Institute of Physical Medicine and Rehabilitation (NIPMR) at Kallettumakara.

Educational Organizations

Between the 14th and 16th Century, it was a center of learning. Kerala school of astronomy and mathematics which was believed to be founded here, made major contributions in Algebra, Arithmetic, Astronomy, Calculus, Geometry, Infinite Series and Linguistics.

Colleges
Christ College, Irinjalakuda
St. Joseph's College, Irinjalakuda
Christ College of Engineering, Irinjalakuda
Christ College of Physical Education, Irinjalakuda
Tharananellur College of Arts and Science, Thanissery
Universal College of Engineering, Vallivattom

STATE
Don Bosco Higher Secondary School
L. F. C. H. S. S., Irinjalakuda
S. N. H. S. S., Irinjalakuda
National Higher Secondary School
St Mary's Higher Secondary School
Govt Boys' Higher Secondary School
Govt Girls' Higher Secondary School

CBSE
Bhavan's Vidya Mandir, Irinjalakuda
 Santhinikethan Public School, Irinjalakuda

ICSE
DON Bosco Central School (ICSE)
Christ Vidya Nikethan

Language institute
Perfect English Academy

Notable People
Irinjalakuda has been the home of many notable people, including
Madhava of Sangamagrama (Sangamagrama believed to include parts of Irinjalakuda)
Unnayi Warrier 
Innocent
P. Jayachandran
Dr. K. Radhakrishnan
Anand
Dr. James Pazhayatil
Dr. M. Subhadra Nair
Olympian Chandrasekharan
N. C. Vasanthakokilam
Dr. R. Bindu
K. Rekha
Tovino Thomas
Idavela Babu
Jijoy Rajagopal
Govind Vasantha
Anupama Parameswaran
Sidin Sunny Vadukut
K V Ramanathan Master (Children's story writer)

Industries

Irinjalakuda is a centre of agro industries. The town is home to Kerala Solvent Extractions Limited (KSE Limited), which is a prominent cattlefeed manufacturing company in south India. State-owned cattlefeed manufacturing company Kerala Feeds Limited is located at Kallettumkara, around 2km away from Irinjalakuda railway station and 9km away from Irinjalakuda town. Irinjalakuda has several coconut oil manufacturing companies, including KLF and KPL oil mills. The neighbourhood of Irinjalakuda is home to three cashew processing factories, located at Pullur, Muriyad and Aloor.The town and its neighbouring areas also host a number of bellmetal manufacturing units.

See also
Avinissery
Kodungallur
Kallamkunnu
Vallakkunnu

References

External links

 Irinjalakuda Municipality : Official Website
 News Portal of Irinjalakuda

 
Cities and towns in Thrissur district